Raymond Aumae  was the third  Bishop of Malaita, one of the nine dioceses that make up the Anglican Church of Melanesia: he served from 1990 to 1994.

References

Anglican bishops of Malaita
21st-century Anglican bishops in Oceania